Heaven Taste is a compilation of B-sides and rarities released by British art rock band No-Man in 1995 and remastered in 1998. It consists on a collection of unreleased music recorded in a range of years between 1991 and 1995.
The sound of the songs is often similar to Nick Drake, Talk Talk and Steve Reich. In  Heaven Taste was remastered and released with new cover art. The title track on this reissue is slightly longer.
The version of Nick Drake's "Road" was originally featured on the 1991 Nick Drake tribute album, Brittle Days.

Track listing
 "Long Day Fall" (Tim Bowness, Steven Wilson, Ben Coleman) – 5:19date: 
 "Babyship Blue" (Bowness, Wilson) – 4:53date: , remix: 
 "Bleed" (Bowness, Wilson) – 6:50date: , remix: 
 "Road" (Nick Drake) – 3:16date: 
 "Heaven Taste" (Wilson) – 21:21 (22:30 on 2002 release)date:

Personnel
 Tim Bowness – vocals and words on tracks 1 to 4
 Steven Wilson – instruments and backing vocals
 Richard Barbieri – keyboards and programming on track 5
 Ben Coleman – acoustic and electric violins on tracks 1, 2, and 5
 Steve Jansen – drums and percussion programming on track 5
 Mick Karn – fretless bass, dida, and saxophone on track 5

References

No-Man albums
1995 compilation albums